Richard Fontaine Maury (Philadelphia, 18 December 1882 – Córdoba, 10 July 1950) was an American railway engineer and naturalized Argentine. He became known for the project of the Argentine "Ramal C-14" of the Ferrocarril General Manuel Belgrano and the touristic Tren a las Nubes.

Early life
Richard Maury was born in Philadelphia in 1882, as the second of four brothers. He was the son of Thompson Brooke Maury. He graduated from Virginia Military Institute as an engineer in 1902. His first work was on the Pennsylvania Tunnel New York City-New Jersey.

Career 
In 1906 he arrived in Argentina to join in 1907 the Argentine State Railway, the national railway company of the country.

In 1921, the "Ramal C-14" Salta-Socompa, a project to build a rail line to the Chilean border was approved. Maury was appointed the head of the project. He worked there until 1931.

On July 12, 1928, he was appointed honorary professor at the National University of Tucumán, where he also published,

in 1929, he published Manual para el trazado de ferrocarriles (i.e. "Manual for the railway tracks"). He was declared the first honorary member of the Engineering Center of Tucumán in 1944.

Maury worked on the Transandine Railway from Mendoza to Las Cuevas, Argentina, on the road from Acheral to Tafi del Valle, and the railway line Yacuíba-Santa Cruz-Sucre, in Bolivia.

Personal life 
He married Carmen Rosa Pauna with whom he had one child, Ricardo Juan.

Richard Maury died in Córdoba in 1950 and, since 1957, his remains are buried at the foot of a monument dedicated to him in the station of Campo Quijano, a town near Salta in the Salta–Antofagasta railway. A little village and its station, part of this line and originally named "Damián M. Torino", were renamed "Ingeniero Maury" (Engineer Maury) after him.

See also 

Rail transport in Argentina
History of Argentina
Tren a las Nubes
Transandine Railway
Salta–Antofagasta railway

Literature
Richard F. Maury: "Manual para el trazado de ferrocarriles". National University of Tucumán, 1929 - 312 pages

References

External links

 Richard Maury bio and picture at trenalasnubes.freeservers.com

1882 births
1950 deaths
20th-century Argentine engineers
Argentine people in rail transport
American railroad mechanical engineers
People from Philadelphia
People from San Miguel de Tucumán
American emigrants to Argentina
Naturalized citizens of Argentina
Engineers from Pennsylvania